Spread Eagle is an unincorporated community in Florence County, in the town of Florence, in the U.S. state of Wisconsin. It is part of the Iron Mountain, MI–WI Micropolitan Statistical Area.

Transportation
The community is located on U.S. Highway 141 and U.S. Highway 2, about six miles northwest of Iron Mountain, Michigan. It is near the south end of Railroad Lake of the Spread Eagle Chain of Lakes.

Attractions
The lake chain was named "Spread Eagle" because when seen from the sky, the chain resembles an eagle with wings spread. Spread Eagle has frequently been noted on lists of unusual place names. The Spread Eagle Barrens State Natural Area is located nearby. The Badwater Ski-Ters Water Ski Show performs during the summer. Legendary "PaddleBoatMan" can occasionally be seen performing on Cosgrove Lake on Sunday mornings.

Notable people
Lorraine Seratti, Wisconsin businesswoman and state legislator, lived in Spread Eagle.

Notes

External links
Spread Eagle Chain of Lakes Association website
Spread Eagle Barrens
Badwater Ski-Ters Water Ski Show

Unincorporated communities in Florence County, Wisconsin
Unincorporated communities in Wisconsin
Iron Mountain micropolitan area